Paul Walsh is an English former professional footballer and sports television pundit

Paul Walsh may also refer to:

 Paul Walsh (Gaelic footballer) (born 1998), Irish Gaelic footballer
 Paul Walsh (priest) (1885–1941), Irish priest and historian
 Paul Walsh (singer), lead singer of Irish band Royseven 
 Paul Henry Walsh (1937–2014), American prelate of the Roman Catholic Church
 Paul S. Walsh (born 1955), former CEO of Diageo (2000–2013)